Governor Gardner may refer to:

Booth Gardner (1936–2013), 19th Governor of Washington
Frederick D. Gardner (1869–1933), 34th Governor of Missouri
Henry Gardner (1819–1892), 23rd Governor of Massachusetts
Oliver Max Gardner (1882–1947), 57th Governor of North Carolina

See also
William Tudor Gardiner (1892–1953), 55th Governor of Maine